Bakaludun-e Shabliz (also Romanized as Bakalūdūn-e Shablīz; also known as Balkehdūn) is a village in Pataveh Rural District, Pataveh District, Dana County, Kohgiluyeh and Boyer-Ahmad Province, Iran. At the 2006 census, its population was 38, in 7 families.

References 

Populated places in Dana County